Tower Rock is a landmark island in the Mississippi River, in Perry County, Missouri.

Tower Rock may also refer to:
 Tower Rock State Park, in Cascade County, Montana
 A rock formation near Chillagoe, Queensland, Australia
 A rock formation on the Cispus River in Washington